Sobrance District is a district in
the Košice Region of eastern Slovakia.
It is the easternmost district of the Košice Region. Sobrance district borders Michalovce District, Prešov Region and Ukraine. It lies mainly on a lowlands of Eastern Slovak Lowland. Sobrance district was established in 1996. The administrative, cultural end economy center is Sobrance town.

Municipalities

Baškovce
Beňatina
Bežovce
Blatná Polianka
Blatné Remety
Blatné Revištia
Bunkovce
Fekišovce
Hlivištia
Horňa
Husák
Choňkovce
Inovce
Jasenov
Jenkovce
Kolibabovce
Koňuš
Koromľa
Krčava
Kristy
Lekárovce
Nižná Rybnica
Nižné Nemecké
Orechová
Ostrov
Petrovce
Pinkovce
Podhoroď
Porostov
Porúbka
Priekopa
Remetské Hámre
Ruská Bystrá
Ruskovce
Ruský Hrabovec
Sejkov
Sobrance
Svätuš
Tašuľa
Tibava
Úbrež
Veľké Revištia
Vojnatina
Vyšná Rybnica
Vyšné Nemecké
Vyšné Remety
Záhor

References

External links
http://www.slovakregion.sk/okres-sobrance

Districts of Slovakia
Geography of Košice Region